The 1969 NFL season was the 50th regular season of the National Football League, and its last before the AFL–NFL merger. To honor the NFL's fiftieth season, a special anniversary logo was designed and each player wore a patch on their jerseys with this logo throughout the season.

Per the agreement made during the  season, the New Orleans Saints and the New York Giants switched divisions again, returning to the 1967 alignment.

The season ended when the Minnesota Vikings defeated the Cleveland Browns in the NFL championship game, earning the right to face the American Football League's champion Kansas City Chiefs in Super Bowl IV at Tulane Stadium in New Orleans. This was the last awarding of the Ed Thorp Memorial Trophy to the NFL champion; it was introduced 35 years earlier in 1934.

As was the case the previous season, the NFL champion was not crowned as the "world champion" because of the Vikings' 23–7 loss to the Chiefs in the Super Bowl. This occurrence can no longer happen, as the AFL and the NFL completed their merger the following season, realigned into two 13-team conferences (AFC, NFC) in one league (the NFL), with the conference champions meeting in the Super Bowl.

Draft
The 1969 NFL/AFL draft was held January 28–29 at New York City's Belmont Plaza Hotel. With the first pick, the Buffalo Bills selected running back O. J. Simpson from the University of Southern California, the winner of the Heisman Trophy.

Division races
Like the previous two seasons, the Eastern Conference was split into the Capitol and Century Divisions, and the Western Conference had the Coastal and Central Divisions. Through , if two teams were tied for the division lead at season's end, an unscheduled tiebreaker playoff was conducted. As such, only one team in a division would be the division winner, even if the won-lost record was the same. (This tiebreaker was only needed once in the three years it was in existence, when in 1967 the Rams and Colts tied for the Coastal Division title (and best record in the league) but the Rams advanced to the playoffs based on their 1–0–1 record vs. the Colts).

The 1969 division races were largely uneventful. All four division winners assumed first place by week five and never relinquished it. The closest races were in the Central and Coastal, where the Vikings and Rams won their divisions by 2½ games, but the Rams had clinched with four games to play and the Vikings with three games to play. As home field in playoffs was rotated and not determined by a teams' record at that time, the division winners had nothing to play for and the last month of the season was uneventful, save for the Rams' quest for a perfect record, which ended in L.A. in a week 12 loss to the Vikings, 20–13.

The other story of note was Vince Lombardi's return to coaching, taking over the Washington Redskins after a one-year hiatus in Green Bay; he led the Redskins to a 7–5–2 finish, their first winning record in fifteen years. It was his only season in Washington, as he died of cancer the following September.

*indicates more than one team with record

Final standings

Postseason

NFL playoffs

In the Eastern Conference championship game, the Cleveland Browns and Dallas Cowboys met for the third straight year. The Cowboys had won in 1967 in Dallas and the Browns in 1968 in Cleveland; this was the rubber match before the Browns would move to the American Conference in the  merger/realignment. The Cowboys were favored, as they featured the best offense in the NFL, a better record than Cleveland, and were at home. However, the Browns jumped on the Cowboys early and often in cruising to a surprising 38–14 win at the Cotton Bowl.

In the Western Conference, the Vikings were four-point favorites over the Rams in Minnesota. Three weeks earlier, the Vikings (10–1) met the Rams (11–0) in Los Angeles and won, 20–13. This time, the Rams broke out on top and led 17–7 at halftime. After the Vikings scored to make it 17–14, the Rams settled for another short field goal (both Ram field goals came when they could not get a touchdown from inside the 5 yard line; this would ultimately cost them the game) to make it 20–14. Joe Kapp led the Vikings to the go ahead touchdown early in the 4th quarter, helped by a controversial penalty on Rams defender Jim Nettles. Viking receiver John Henderson caught a pass and ran to the Rams 20 yard line where he was tripped up by Eddie Meador.  Not sure if the defender made contact and not hearing a whistle, Henderson got up and starting running; Nettles then tackled him and was called for unnecessary roughness. Nettles claimed he never heard a whistle and asked "what was I supposed to do, stand there and watch him run into the end zone?!" With the ball moved inside the ten-yard line, Kapp eventually put the Vikings ahead 21–20 with a short touchdown run.  Shortly thereafter, Vikings DE Carl Eller sacked Ram QB Roman Gabriel in the end zone to make it 23–20. The Rams forced a Viking punt and began driving for a potential tying field goal or go ahead touchdown but Gabriel was intercepted by Alan Page at the 45-yard line with under two minutes to play to clinch the win. After starting the season with eleven consecutive victories, the Rams lost all four games in December; they won the last edition of the third place Playoff Bowl, shutting out Dallas 31–0 on January 3 in Miami.

In the NFL final in Minnesota on January 4, the Browns were thoroughly dominated for the second year in a row. In 1968, the Colts beat them 34–0 in Cleveland; in this game the Vikings won 27–7, completely shutting down the Browns offense while Minnesota gained nearly 200 rushing yards.

Super Bowl

The Kansas City Chiefs, league champion of the 1969 American Football League season, defeated the Minnesota Vikings, 23–7, at Tulane Stadium in New Orleans, on January 11, 1970.

Awards

Coaching changes
Pittsburgh Steelers: Bill Austin was replaced by Chuck Noll.
New York Giants: Allie Sherman was replaced by Alex Webster.
Philadelphia Eagles: Joe Kuharich was replaced by Jerry Williams.
Washington Redskins: Otto Graham was replaced by Vince Lombardi.

Stadium changes
 The Philadelphia Eagles became the first NFL team to play its home games on artificial turf, installed at Franklin Field.
 The home of the Washington Redskins, D.C. Stadium, was renamed Robert F. Kennedy (RFK) Memorial Stadium in memory of former U.S. Attorney General and U.S. Senator Robert F. Kennedy.

References

 NFL Record and Fact Book
 NFL History 1961–1970 (Last accessed December 4, 2005)
 Total Football: The Official Encyclopedia of the National Football League

National Football League seasons
 
National Football League